Tanjung is a town and district on the island of Lombok.  It is the local capital of the North Lombok Regency in the Indonesian province West Nusa Tenggara. "Tanjung" means "cape" in Indonesian.

Tanjung is known for its market and its temples. There is a new Buddhist temple (Sutta Dhamma Lenek) near Tanjung. Another Buddhist Temple, Vihara Dhamma, can be visited in the centre of Tanjung. About 800 Buddhists live in and around Tanjung. Pura Medana is a significant Hindu temple to the west of Tanjung on the small Sira peninsula. Every Sunday a special cattle market is held in Tanjung.

There are various waterfalls to the east of Tanjung such as Air Terjung Gangga (Gangga waterfall) and Air Terjun Tiu (Tiu waterfall) with a height of 30 metres.

Administrative villages
Tanjung consists of 7 villages (kelurahan or desa) namely:
 Jenggal
 Medana
 Sigar Penjalin
 Sokong
 Tanjung
 Tegal Maja
 Teniga

References

External links

Populated places in Lombok
Regency seats of West Nusa Tenggara